Hammonds Plains, Upper Sackville and Beaver Bank is a planning area in the Halifax Regional Municipality, Nova Scotia.  The area wraps from Exit 5 on Highway 103 to the west of the urban core of Halifax, and runs north and east, wrapping clockwise around the harbour along the Hammonds Plains Road, Lucasville Road and Sackville Drive, through Upper Sackville to Beaverbank.

Hammonds Plains lies at the neck of the Chebucto Peninsula along a road that runs from Bedford to the Head of St. Margarets Bay within the Halifax Regional Municipality Nova Scotia.  Upper Sackville is a Canadian suburban community in Nova Scotia's Halifax Regional Municipality. It is situated in the Sackville River valley immediately north of Middle Sackville and south of Mount Uniacke on Trunk 1. Upper Sackville is approximately 23 kilometers driving distance from downtown Halifax.  Beaver Bank is a community northeast of Lower Sackville on the Beaver Bank Road (Route 354) within the Halifax Regional Municipality Nova Scotia that is 25 Kilometers from the community of Halifax.

Communities
Beaver Bank
Hammonds Plains
Kinsac
Lucasville
Sackville
Stillwater Lake

References

Communities in Halifax, Nova Scotia